For each de jure and de facto  sovereign state and dependent territory an article on elections in that entity has been included and information on the way the head of state, head of government, and the legislature is selected. Merged cells for "head of state" and "head of government" indicate the office is the same for that country; merged cells for "lower house" and "upper house" indicate a unicameral legislature. The linked articles include the results of the elections.  For a chronological order, see the electoral calendar.

A

B

C

D

E

F

G

H

I

J

K

L

M

N

O

P

Q

R

S

T

U

V

W

Y

Z

See also
 List of close election results
 List of democracy and elections-related topics
 List of legislatures by country

References

External links

 http://www.ipu.org/parline-e/parlinesearch.asp PARLINE database on national parliaments - contains information on the structure and working methods of 265 parliamentary chambers in all of the 189 countries where a national legislature exists.
ACE Electoral Knowledge Network Expert site providing encyclopedia on Electoral Systems and Management, country by country data, a library of electoral materials, latest election news, the opportunity to submit questions to a network of electoral experts, and a forum to discuss all of the above
Election Resources
Adam Carr's Election Archive
International Foundation for Electoral Systems' Electionguide
African Elections Database